The 1996 Fordham Rams football team was an American football team that represented Fordham University during the 1996 NCAA Division I-AA football season. Fordham finished second-to-last in the Patriot League. 

In their third year under head coach Nick Quartaro, the Rams compiled a 2–8 record. Carl Barbera, Mark Bourke, Jim Ciarlante and Kevin Szocik were the team captains.

The Rams were outscored 248 to 172. Their 1–3 conference record placed fifth in the six-team Patriot League standings. 

Though 11 games were scheduled, only 10 were played. Fordham's planned meeting with league opponent Lafayette on October 12 was canceled after a Fordham player collapsed and died during that day's pregame warmups. The teams were prepared to play the game November 27 if necessary to determine the league championship. Because neither team was in contention for first place at the scheduled end of the season, the makeup game was not played.

Fordham played its home games at Jack Coffey Field on the university campus in The Bronx, in New York City.

Schedule

Roster

References

Fordham
Fordham Rams football seasons
Fordham Rams football